Four-ball billiards or four-ball carom (often abbreviated to simply four-ball, and sometimes spelled 4-ball or fourball) is a carom billiards game, played on a pocketless table with four billiard balls, usually two red and two white, one of the latter with a spot to distinguish it (in some sets, one of the white balls is yellow instead of spotted). Two points are scored when the shooter caroms on each of the three object balls in a single shot. A carom on only one ball results in no points, and ends the shooter's .

Asian variations

The game is played with two red object balls, one white cue ball and one yellow cue ball (or sometimes both cue balls are white, one having a red spot). Each of the two players is assigned a white or yellow cue ball; whether the opponent can use it as an object ball is a difference between the Japanese and Korean versions. A point is scored when the shooter caroms on two balls. A carom on only one ball results in no points, and ends the shooter's inning.

There are a few differences between the Korean and the Japanese variants:
 Starting position: In the Korean version, the cue ball is placed beside one of the red object balls for the opening shot, and play commences by hitting the red ball on the opposite side of the table (as in three-cushion billiards). In the Japanese version, the cue ball is placed behind the second red object ball, and play commences by hitting the red object ball nearest to the cue ball.
 Object balls: In the Korean version, a player is penalized a point if the cue ball caroms off the opponent's cue ball. In the Japanese version, doing so is legal, as the opponent's cue ball is available as an object ball; caroming on all three balls scores two points.
 Winning: In the Korean version, after having scored the final point, a win is secured by doing a three- shot; until one is successfully played, the player lagging behind can still catch up and win. In this respect, it is similar to the game play of the darts game cricket. In the Japanese version, the game is simply over when a player reaches the agreed-upon score.

Central European variation
A variation of four-ball called desítkový karambol (Czech for 'tenfold carom') is popular in Central Europe, especially in the Czech Republic.  It is played with white ball, a blue ball, a yellow ball and a red ball which serves as the cue ball for both players. Players score a point by hitting two of the other three balls with the cue ball. A carom off all three object balls in one shot, however, scores 10 points. The score is doubled by hitting a cushion before hitting any of the other balls for a total of either two or 20 points in one shot.

References

External links
Photo of yotsudama balls from a commercial supplier
Article  explaining the differences between the Korean and Japanese variants, and with images showing the different placement of the balls for the opening shot
Link to a Czech Republic source  explaining the rules of Czech four-ball
Instruction video for Czech four-ball carom 
German game of saupartie, identical to Czech rules 
Dutch four-ball rules (honderden) 
"4-Ball" Rules Presentation video by the Fédération Française de Billard. Rules are similar to the East Asian ones but using Central European balls and a standard carom starting position.
1914 rules for four-ball carom by Brunswick-Balke-Collender Company on pages 9 and 10.
An 1866 excerpt about a historical American game, a variation of English billiards played on a table with four pockets unlike the versions listed above. Points are scored either by caroming at least two balls or ting balls, but performing  rebounds is a foul.
A website of another form of 4 Ball Billiards complete with explanation of rules and variations. Unlike the versions listed above, this one is played on an ordinary Pool/Snooker table and points are scored by ting balls or performing  rebounds as well as caroming at least two balls; hence the game borrows most rules from English billiards
Carom billiards